Santa Margherita di Atri  is a frazione in the municipality of Atri in the  Province of Teramo in the Abruzzo region of Italy. It is located in the countryside and about 11 kilometers from the Adriatic Sea.

Among all the hamlets of Atri is the second smallest after San Giacomo di Atri with about 400 inhabitants.

Physical Geography 
The nearby centers are Fontanelle di Atri and San Giacomo di Atri. The country also boasts small districts, including Conicella, Falsacappa and Contrada Bertolone.

The small fraction includes only 5 streets: via Santa Margherita, via Cavoni, via Logge, via Niccolò degli Arcioni and via Melegnano. The latter is the main route which also indicates the old name of the village, before assuming the current name of the patron saint.

Events 
In summer, two important festivals are organized in the country:

 The feast of Santa Margherita, in honor of the patron saint. It is conducted annually on 20 July.
 The Feast of the Arrosticini and Pecorino Cheese, which is well known in the Province of Teramo, which attracts numerous visitors.

An exhibition of dialect theater is also conducted with to Melegnano award given. Sport events happen occasionally.

References 

Frazioni of the Province of Teramo